Precision Boat Works, Inc. is an American boat builder, initially based in Palmetto, Florida and now in Sarasota, Florida. From 1978 until 2018, the company specialized in the design and manufacture of fiberglass sailboats, but today just produces parts for their existing fleet.

The company was founded by brothers Richard and Bill Porter in 1978.

History

The first design produced was the Uffa Fox and George O'Day-designed Day Sailer, as well as the Seaforth 24.

Many of the company's boats were designed by naval architect Jim Taylor of Marblehead, Massachusetts, a designer known for his America's Cup competition boats.

By 2018 the company was producing six designs, the Precision 15, 165, 18, 185, 21 and the 23. After a production run of nearly 5,000 boats, the Porters decided to retire in August 2018. Bill Porter continued making parts for the existing boat fleet and moved the parts business to Sarasota, Florida.

Author Steve Henkel praised the quality of construction of the company's boats in his 2010 book, The Sailor's Book of Small Cruising Sailboats, calling it "well above average", but noted that the company made many essential parts, like boom vangs optional. He wrote that the company has "solid construction ... good and caring customer service, and a well-satisfied and loyal owner group."

Boats 

Summary of boats built by Precision Boat Works:

Day Sailer - 1978
Seaforth 24 - 1978
Precision 18 - 1984
Precision 13 - 1985
Precision 14 - 1985
Precision 16 - 1985
Precision 21 - 1986
Precision 23 - 1986
Precision 27 - 1989
11 Meter - 1990
Precision 15 - 1995
Precision 15 CB - 1995
Precision 165 - 1995
Colgate 26 - 1996
Precision 28 - 1997
Precision 185 - 2001
Precision 185 CB - 2001
Transit 380 - 2005

See also
List of sailboat designers and manufacturers

References

External links

Precision Boat Works